The 2002 Open 13 was a men's ATP tennis tournament played on indoor hard courts at the Palais des Sports de Marseille in Marseille in France and was part of the International Series of the 2002 ATP Tour. It was the tenth edition of the tournament and was held from 11 February until 17 February 2002. Unseeded Thomas Enqvist won the singles title.

Finals

Singles

 Thomas Enqvist defeated  Nicolas Escudé 6–7(4–7), 6–3, 6–1
 It was Enqvist's only singles title of the year and the 19th and last of his career.

Doubles

 Arnaud Clément /  Nicolas Escudé defeated  Julien Boutter /  Max Mirnyi 6–4, 6–3
 It was Clément's only title of the year and the 3rd of his career. It was Escude's 1st title of the year and the 3rd of his career.

References

External links
 Official website 
 ATP tournament profile
 ITF tournament edition details

Open 13
Open 13
Open 13
Open 13